Nicomachus of Gerasa (c. 60 – c. 120 AD) was an important ancient mathematician and music theorist, best known for his works Introduction to Arithmetic and Manual of Harmonics in Greek. He was born in Gerasa, in the Roman province of Syria (now Jerash, Jordan). He was a Neopythagorean, who wrote about the mystical properties of numbers.

Life
Little is known about the life of Nicomachus except that he was a Pythagorean who came from Gerasa. Historians consider him a Neopythagorean based on his tendency to view numbers as having mystical properties. The age in which he lived (c. 100 AD) is only known because he mentions Thrasyllus in his Manual of Harmonics, and because his Introduction to Arithmetic was apparently translated into Latin in the mid 2nd century by Apuleius. His Manual of Harmonics was addressed to a lady of noble birth, at whose request Nicomachus wrote the book, which suggests that he was a respected scholar of some status. He mentions his intent to write a more advanced work, and how the journeys he frequently undertakes leave him short of time.

Works

Introduction to Arithmetic

Introduction to Arithmetic (Ἀριθμητικὴ εἰσαγωγή, Arithmetike eisagoge), the lesser work on arithmetic. As a Neopythagorean, Nicomachus was often more interested in the mystical properties of numbers rather than their mathematical properties. According to Henrietta O. Midonick (1965), he distinguishes between the wholly conceptual immaterial number, which he regards as the 'divine number', and the numbers which measure material things, the 'scientific' number. He writes extensively on numbers, especially on the significance of prime numbers and perfect numbers and argues that arithmetic is ontologically prior to the other mathematical sciences (music, geometry, and astronomy), and is their cause.  Boethius' De institutione arithmetica is in large part a Latin translation of this work.
However Introduction of Arithmetic does contain quite elementary errors which show that Nicomachus chose not to give proofs of his results because he did not in general have such proofs. Many of the results were known by Nicomachus to be true since they appeared with proofs in Euclid's Elements, although in a geometrical formulation. Sometimes Nicomachus states a result which is simply false and then illustrates it with an example that happens to have the properties described in the result. We can deduce from this that some of the results are merely guesses based on the evidence of the numerical examples.

Although he was preceded by the Babylonians and the Chinese, Nicomachus provided one of the earliest Greco-Roman multiplication tables, whereas the oldest extant Greek multiplication table is found on a wax tablet dated to the 1st century AD (now found in the British Museum).

Manual of Harmonics
Manuale Harmonicum (Ἐγχειρίδιον ἁρμονικῆς, Encheiridion Harmonikes). This is the first important music theory treatise since the time of Aristoxenus and Euclid.  It provides the earliest surviving record of the legend of Pythagoras's epiphany outside of a smithy that pitch is determined by numeric ratios.  Nicomachus also gives the first in-depth account of the relationship between music and the ordering of the universe via the "music of the spheres."  Nicomachus's discussion of the governance of the ear and voice in understanding music unites Aristoxenian and Pythagorean concerns, normally regarded as antitheses.  In the midst of theoretical discussions, Nicomachus also describes the instruments of his time, also providing a valuable resource.  In addition to the Manual, ten extracts survive from what appear to have originally been a more substantial work on music.

Lost works
The works which are lost are:
Art of Arithmetic, the larger work on arithmetic, mentioned by Photius.
A larger work on music, promised by Nicomachus himself, and apparently referred to by Eutocius in his comment on the sphere and cylinder of Archimedes.
An Introduction to Geometry, referred to by Nicomachus, although whether it was his work is unclear.
Theology of Arithmetic, on the Pythagorean mystical properties of numbers in two books mentioned by Photius. There is an extant work sometimes attributed to Iamblichus under this title written two centuries later which contains a great deal of material thought to have been copied or paraphrased from Nicomachus' work.
A Life of Pythagoras (per Iamblichus), one of the main sources used by Porphyry and Iamblichus, for their (extant) Lives of Pythagoras.
A collection of Pythagorean dogmata, referred to by Iamblichus.
On Egyptian festivals, is mentioned by Athenaeus, but whether by this Nicomachus is uncertain.

See also
Monad
Dyad
Triad
Tetrad
Nicomachus's theorem
Superparticular number
Superpartient number
Philolaus

Notes

References
Andrew Barker, editor, Greek Musical Writings vol 2: Harmonic and Acoustic Theory (Cambridge: Cambridge University Press, 1989), pp. 245–69.

External links

Nicomachus' "Introduction to Arithmetic"  translated by Martin Luther D'ooge.
 
Nicomachus' Nicomachi Geraseni Pythagorei introductionis arithmeticae libri II recesuit Ricardus Hoche, Lipsiae in aedibus B. G. Teubneri, 1866.
 Musici scriptores graeci, Aristoteles, Euclides, Nicomachus, Bacchius, Gaudentius, Alypius et medlodiarum veterum quidquid exstat, recognovit prooemius et indice instruxit Carolus Janus, Lipsiae in aedibus B. G. Teubneri, 1895, pagg. 209-282.

60 births
120 deaths
1st-century philosophers
1st-century Greek people
2nd-century Greek people
Ancient Greek mathematicians
Neo-Pythagoreans
People from Jerash
Pythagoreans
Ancient Roman philosophers
Ancient Greek music theorists
2nd-century writers
1st-century mathematicians
2nd-century mathematicians